Naturalisation (or naturalization) is the ecological phenomenon through which a species, taxon, or population of exotic (as opposed to native) origin integrates into a given ecosystem, becoming capable of reproducing and growing in it, and proceeds to disseminate spontaneously. In some instances,  the presence of a species in a given ecosystem is so ancient that it cannot be presupposed whether it is native or introduced.

Generally, any introduced species may (in the wild) either go extinct or naturalise in its new environment.

Some populations do not sustain themselves reproductively, but exist because of continued influx from elsewhere. Such a non-sustaining population, or the individuals within it, are said to be adventive. Cultivated plants are a major source of adventive populations.

The above refers to naturalize as an intransitive verb, as in, "The species naturalized". In North America it is common to use naturalize as a transitive verb, as in, "City staff naturalized the park". This means to allow an environment to revert to its natural state.

Botany 
In botany, naturalisation is the situation in which an exogenous plant  reproduces  and disperses on its own in a new environment. For example, northern white cedar is naturalised in United Kingdom, where it reproduces on its own, while it is not in France, where human intervention via cuttings  or seeds are essential for its dissemination.

Two categories of naturalisation are defined from two distinct parameters: one, archaeonaturalised, refers to introduction before a given time (introduced over a hundred years ago), while the second, amphinaturalised or eurynaturalised, implies a notion of spatial extension (taxon assimilated indigenous and present over a vast space, opposed to stenonaturalised).

Degrees of naturalisation 
The degrees of naturalisation are defined in relation to the status of  nativity or  introduction of taxons or species;
 Accidental taxon: non- native taxon growing spontaneously, which appears sporadically as a result of accidental introduction due to human activities (as opposed to intentional introductions)
 Subspontaneous taxon: taxon naturalised following an introduction of accidental origin (fortuitous introduction linked to human activities) or unknown, and which, after acclimatization, can reproduce like native plants but is still poorly established.
 Spontaneous taxon: native or non-native taxon growing and reproducing naturally, without intentional human intervention in the territory considered, and is well established (mixes with local flora or fauna).

Zoology 
Animal naturalisation is mainly carried out through breeding and by commensalism following  human migrations.

The concerned species are thus:
 either introduced voluntarily into an ecosystem where they are not native;
 either accidentally introduced or become feral;
 or by naturally following human migratory flows by commensalism (eg: arrival of house sparrow in Western Europe following Huns, and previously in Eastern Europe from Asia Minor in  Antiquity).

It sometimes happens that a naturalised species hybridizes with a native.

Introduction and origin areas 
The introduction site or introduction area is the place or, in a broadlier way, the new environment where the candidate species for naturalisation takes root. It is generally opposed to the origin area, where this same species is native.

There is also a more ambiguous notion that is the "natural distribution area" or "natural distribution range", particularly when it comes to anthropophilic species or some species benefiting from anthropogenic land settlement (canals, bridges, deforestation, etc.) that have connected two previously isolated areas (eg: the Suez canal which causes Lessepsian migration).

Impact on the ecosystem 
Naturalisation is sometimes done with human help in order to replace another species having suffered directly or indirectly from anthropogenic activities, or deemed less profitable for human use.

Some naturalised species eventually become invasive. For example, the european rabbit, native to Europe and which abounds in Australia; or the Japanese knotweed which is invading Europe and America where it is considered to be amongst the  one hundred most invasive species in the 21st century Apart from direct competition between native and introduced populations, genetic pollution by hybridization can add up cumulatively to environmental effects that compromise the conservation of native populations 

Some naturalised species, such as palms, can act as ecosystem engineers, by changing the habitat and creating new niches that can sometimes have positive effects on an ecosystem. Potential and/or perceived positive impacts of naturalised species are less studied than potential and/or perceived negative impacts. 

However, the impact on local species is not easy to assess in a short period. For instance, the African sacred ibis (Threskiornis aethiopicus) escaped in 1990 from an animal park in Morbihan (France), gave rise to an eradication campaign in 2008. In 2013, however, the CNRS stated that this bird species is not a threat in France, and may even promote Eurasian spoonbill and limit the development of the invasive Louisiana crayfish. 

Naturalised species may become invasive species if they become sufficiently abundant to have an adverse effect on native species (eg: microbes affected by invasive plants ) or on biotope.

See also
 Adventitious plant
 Adventive species 
 Colonisation (biology)
 Cosmopolitan distribution
 Endemism
 Hemerochory 
 Indigenous (ecology)
 Introduced species
 Invasive species

References

Ecological processes
Ecology terminology
.